Paul Henry (11 April 1876 – 24 August 1958) was an Irish artist noted for depicting the West of Ireland landscape in a spare Post-Impressionist style.

Biography

Henry was born at 61 University Road, Belfast, Ireland, the son of the Rev Robert Mitchell Henry, a Baptist minister (who later joined the Plymouth Brethren), and Kate Ann Berry.

Henry began studying at Methodist College Belfast in 1882 where he first began drawing regularly. At the age of fifteen he moved to the Royal Belfast Academical Institution. He studied art at the Belfast School of Art before going to Paris in 1898 to study at the Académie Julian and at Whistler's Académie Carmen.

He married the painter Grace Henry in 1903 and returned to Ireland in 1910. From then until 1919 he lived on Achill Island, where he learned to capture the peculiar interplay of light and landscape specific to the West of Ireland. In 1919 he moved to Dublin and in 1920 was one of the founders of the Society of Dublin Painters, originally a group of ten artists. Henry designed several railway posters, some of which, notably Connemara Landscape, achieved considerable sales. He separated from his wife in 1929. His second wife was the artist Mabel Young.

In the 1920s and 1930s Henry was Ireland's best known artist, one who had a considerable influence on the popular image of the west of Ireland. Although he seems to have ceased experimenting with his technique after he left Achill and his range is limited, he created a large body of fine images whose familiarity is a testament to its influence.

Henry's use of colour was affected by his red-green color blindness. He lost his sight during 1945 and did not regain his vision before his death.

A commemorative exhibition of Henry's work was held at Trinity College, Dublin, in 1973 and the National Gallery of Ireland held a major exhibition of his work in 2004.

A painting by Henry was featured on an episode of the BBC's Antiques Roadshow, broadcast on 12 November 2006. The painting was given a value of approximately £40,000–60,000 by the roadshow. However, due to the buoyancy of the Irish art market at that time, it sold for €260,000 on 5 December 2006 in James Adams' and Bonhams' joint Important Irish Art sale.

He died at his home at 1 Sidmonton Square, Bray, County Wicklow, and was survived by his wife, Mabel.

Work in collections
Model Arts and Niland Gallery, Sligo
Crawford Art Gallery, Cork (including Landscape; 1923)
Musée du Luxembourg
National Gallery of Ireland, Dublin
Ulster Museum, Belfast
Hunt Museum, Limerick

See also
List of Northern Irish artists

References

External links
 
Raymond Keaveney (2002), National Gallery of Ireland: Essential Guide. London: Scala Publishers. .
Biographical note on achill247.com

1876 births
1958 deaths
19th-century Irish painters
20th-century Irish painters
Irish male painters
Alumni of Belfast School of Art
Académie Carmen alumni
Académie Julian alumni
Artists from Belfast
Painters from Northern Ireland
People educated at Methodist College Belfast
Members of the Royal Ulster Academy
19th-century Irish male artists
20th-century Irish male artists